The 2016–17 Missouri State Bears basketball team represented Missouri State University during the 2016–17 NCAA Division I men's basketball season. The Bears, led by sixth-year head coach Paul Lusk, played their home games at JQH Arena in Springfield, Missouri as members of the Missouri Valley Conference. They finished the regular season 17–16, 7–11 in MVC play to finish in a tie for sixth place. As the No. 6 seed in the MVC tournament, they defeated Northern Iowa in the quarterfinals before losing to Wichita State in the semifinals.

Previous season 
The Bears finished the 2015–16 season 13–19, 8–10 in Missouri Valley play to finish in a tie for sixth place. They defeated Drake in the first round of the Missouri Valley tournament to advance to the quarterfinals where they lost to Evansville.

Offseason

Departures

Incoming transfers

2016 recruiting class

Roster

Schedule and results

|-
!colspan=9 style=| Exhibition

|-
!colspan=9 style=| Non-conference regular season

|-
!colspan=12 style=| Missouri Valley Conference regular season

|-
!colspan=9 style=| Missouri Valley tournament

References

Missouri State Bears basketball seasons
Missouri State